Karolina Pieńkowska (born 17 August 1993) is a Polish judoka.

She is the silver medallist of the 2018 Judo Grand Slam Düsseldorf in the -52 kg category.

References

External links
 

1993 births
Living people
Polish female judoka
21st-century Polish women